Chlorite dismutase, also known as Chlorite O2-lyase, is an enzyme that catalyzes the chemical reaction

 ClO → Cl− + O2

Reactions that generate oxygen molecules are exceedingly rare in biology and difficult to mimic synthetically. Perchlorate - respiring bacteria enzymatically detoxify chlorite, ClO, the end product of the perchlorate, ClO, respiratory pathway, by converting it to dioxygen, O2, and chloride, Cl−. Chlorite dismutase is a heme-containing protein, but it bears no structural or sequence relationships with known peroxidases or other heme proteins and is part of a large family of proteins with more than one biochemical function.

References

EC 1.13.11
Enzymes of unknown structure